Roth/Kirschenbaum Films (formerly Roth Films) is a production company formed in 2007 by producer Joe Roth, the founder of Revolution Studios.

History 

Joe Roth announced that they signed an overall deal with Sony Pictures in October 2007, when Revolution Studios' deal with Sony Pictures Entertainment was about to end.

The studio's first production, Alice in Wonderland in 2010, grossed $1 billion worldwide.

In 2015, Jeff Kirschenbaum announced that he would leave Universal Pictures in order to join Roth Films, which they rebranded to its current name Roth/Kirschenbaum Films.

Filmography

Feature films

2010s

2020s

Upcoming

Television

References

External links 
 Roth Films on IMDb
 Roth/Kirschenbaum Films on IMDb
 RK films on IMDb

Film production companies of the United States
Entertainment companies established in 2007
Companies based in Los Angeles
American companies established in 2007
Entertainment companies based in California